Moreau Drive Historic District is a national historic district located at Jefferson City, Cole County, Missouri.  It encompasses 252 contributing buildings and 3 contributing structures in a predominantly residential section of Jefferson City. The district developed between about 1847 and 1950, and includes representative examples of Tudor Revival, Colonial Revival, Bungalow / American Craftsman, and Modern Movement style architecture.

It was listed on the National Register of Historic Places in 2013.

References

Historic districts on the National Register of Historic Places in Missouri
Tudor Revival architecture in Missouri
Colonial Revival architecture in Missouri
Bungalow architecture in Missouri
Modernist architecture in Missouri
Buildings and structures in Cole County, Missouri
Buildings and structures in Jefferson City, Missouri
National Register of Historic Places in Cole County, Missouri